The 2010 Hockey East Men's Ice Hockey Tournament was played between March 12 and March 20, 2010 at campus locations and at the TD Garden in Boston, Massachusetts. Boston College was awarded the Lamoriello Trophy and an automatic bid to the 2010 NCAA Division I Men's Ice Hockey Tournament.

Format
The tournament featured three rounds of play. The teams that finish below eighth in the conference are not eligible for tournament play. In the first round, the first and eighth seeds, the second and seventh seeds, the third seed and sixth seeds, and the fourth seed and fifth seeds played a best-of-three with the winner advancing to the semifinals. In the semifinals, the highest and lowest seeds and second highest and second lowest seeds play a single-elimination game, with the winner advancing to the championship game. The tournament champion receives an automatic bid to the 2010 NCAA Division I Men's Ice Hockey Tournament.

Regular season standings
Note: GP = Games played; W = Wins; L = Losses; T = Ties; PTS = Points; GF = Goals For; GA = Goals Against

Bracket

Note: * denotes overtime periods

Results

Quarterfinals

(1) New Hampshire vs. (8) Vermont

Game 1, March 12

Game 2, March 13

Game 3, March 14

(2) Boston College vs. (7) Massachusetts

Game 1, March 12

Game 2, March 13

(3) Boston University vs. (6) Merrimack

Game 1, March 12

Game 2, March 13

Game 3, March 14

(4) Maine vs. (5) Massachusetts-Lowell

Game 1, March 12

Game 2, March 13

Game 3, March 14

Semifinals, March 19

(2) Boston College vs. (8) Vermont

(3) Boston University vs. (4) Maine

Championship, March 20

(2) Boston College vs. (4) Maine

Tournament awards

All-Tournament Team
F Joey Diamond (Maine)
F Matt Lombardi* (Boston College)
F Gustav Nyquist (Maine)
D Will O'Neill (Maine)
D Carl Sneep (Boston College)
G John Muse (Boston College)
* Tournament MVP(s)

References

External links
 2010 Hockey East Men's Ice Hockey Tournament

Hockey East Men's Ice Hockey Tournament
Hockey East Men's Ice Hockey Tournament